Ana María Casas (born 24 September 1955) is a Mexican gymnast. She competed at the 1972 Summer Olympics.

References

External links
 

1955 births
Living people
Mexican female artistic gymnasts
Olympic gymnasts of Mexico
Gymnasts at the 1972 Summer Olympics
Place of birth missing (living people)
20th-century Mexican women